Bosnia and Herzegovina sent athletes to the Summer Olympic Games under its own flag for the first time in 1992. Bosnian athletes competed under the Yugoslav flag (see Yugoslavia at the Olympics) until the breakup of that country. Along with Albania, Andorra and Monaco, Bosnia and Herzegovina is one of four current European participants that have never won an Olympic medal.

The Olympic Committee of Bosnia and Herzegovina was formed in 1992 and recognized in 1993.

Medal tables

Medals by Summer Games

Medals by Winter Games

Best Placement by summer sport
Bosnia and Herzegovina has yet to win its first medal at Summer Games. Below are the top three placements so far.

Best Placement by winter sport
Bosnia and Herzegovina has yet to win its first medal at Winter Games. Below are the top three placements so far.

Competitors by sport
The following is a list of the total number of competitors by sport in the Games.

Summer

Winter

Flagbearers

Pre-1992 Yugoslavian medalists from Bosnia-Herzegovina 
Bosnian-Herzegovinian athletes have won medals on many occasions in different sports as part of teams and one as individual competitors (boxing) representing Yugoslavia.

Association Football

Basketball

Boxing

Handball

See also
 List of flag bearers for Bosnia and Herzegovina at the Olympics
 Bosnia and Herzegovina at the Paralympics
 Bosnia and Herzegovina at the World Athletics Championships

References

External links